Irma Sinforina Figueroa Romero (born 25 September 1945) is a Mexican politician affiliated with the Party of the Democratic Revolution. As of 2014 she served as Deputy of the LIX Legislature of the Mexican Congress representing Guerrero.

References

1945 births
Living people
People from Huetamo
Politicians from Michoacán
Women members of the Chamber of Deputies (Mexico)
Party of the Democratic Revolution politicians
Instituto Politécnico Nacional alumni
21st-century Mexican politicians
21st-century Mexican women politicians
Deputies of the LIX Legislature of Mexico
Members of the Chamber of Deputies (Mexico) for Guerrero